Zig Zag is the debut album by Latin hip hop group Tha Mexakinz. It was released on May 17, 1994 under Motown Records.

Track listing
 "A Little Sumthin"
"Welkum 2 da Hood"
"Cok Bak da Hamma!"
"Da Joint"
 "Interlude, Pt. 1 – Tha Mexakinz, Mister Nice Guy"
 "Buckwhyle Style"
 "Phonkie Melodia"
 "Da Method"
"Extaseason"
 "Interlude, Pt. 2 – Tha Mexakinz, Mister Nice Guy"
 "Murdah"
 "Push Up n da Wrong 1"
 "It'z On"
 "Phonkie Melodia" remix produced by QD3
 "Epilogue – Tha Mexakinz, Chili & Bean"

References

Tha Mexakinz albums
1994 debut albums
Motown albums